Peter Radacher (born 9 March 1930; date of death unknown) was an Austrian Nordic skier who competed in the 1950s. He competed both in the Nordic combined event and 18 km cross-country skiing events at the 1952 Winter Olympics in Oslo, but did not finish either one.

External links
18 km Olympic cross country results: 1948-52
Olympic nordic combined results: 1948-64

1930 births
Year of death missing
Austrian male cross-country skiers
Austrian male Nordic combined skiers
Olympic cross-country skiers of Austria
Olympic Nordic combined skiers of Austria
Nordic combined skiers at the 1952 Winter Olympics
Cross-country skiers at the 1952 Winter Olympics
20th-century Austrian people